Rusian may refer to:

 Old East Slavic, a language which some scholars refer to as Rusian
 Ruthenian language, also known as Rusian
 Rusian, a fictional character in And You Thought There Is Never a Girl Online?

See also 
 Rus' people
 Ruslan (disambiguation) 
 Russian (disambiguation)
 Rusyn (disambiguation)